THIS IS is a dance music curation brand in the UK that releases dance music compilation albums, curates dance music playlists and puts on live events. They were the first to stream an event live into Spotify.

THIS IS manages a series of dynamic playlists, dance music compilations, and live events.

References

External links 
Official THIS IS Website
 THIS IS Facebook
THIS IS Playlists on Spotify
THIS IS Apple Music
THIS IS Deezer
THIS IS YouTube

Companies based in the London Borough of Camden
Dance music